Eduard Wagner (1 April 1894 – 23 July 1944) was a general in the Army of Nazi Germany who served as quartermaster-general during World War II. He had the overall responsibility for security in the Army Group Rear Areas and thus bore responsibility for the war crimes that were committed by the rear-security units in the occupied areas under the army's jurisdiction.

Life
He was born in Kirchenlamitz, Upper Franconia. After service during World War I, he was a member of the Reichswehr. During World War II, he served as the quartermaster-general from 1941 to 1944 and was promoted to General of the Artillery on 1 August 1943.

On 24 July 1939, he drew up regulations that allowed German soldiers to take hostages from civilian population and execute them as response to resistance. He personally welcomed the idea of future invasion of Poland and wrote that he looked to it "gladly." He had a central role in the death sentences for ten Polish prisoners who were taken during the defense of the Polish Post Office in Danzig.

In May 1941, he drew up the regulations with Reinhard Heydrich that ensured that the army and the Einsatzgruppen would co-operate in murdering Soviet Jews. On the Eastern Front, he had a role in ensuring that suitable winter clothing was supplied to the German forces, and on 27 November 1941 he reported, "We are at the end of our resources in both personnel and material. We are about to be confronted with the dangers of deep winter."

Wagner created policies against Soviet POWs. On 13 November 1941, he declared that ill Soviet prisoners-of-war who were unfit for labor should be allowed to starve to death. Rations for the rest were cut, which ultimately resulted in the deaths of countless Soviet POWs. He also advocated for the Siege of Leningrad.

During the summer of 1942, before his visit to inspect the 6th Army during the Battle of Stalingrad, he informed Hitler of the "lack of sources of fuel." By then, "all the generals avoided contradicting Hitler," as "all feared the hysterical outbursts of this lofty dictator."

After the war, Otto Bräutigam of the Reich Ministry for the Occupied Eastern Territories claimed in his book that in February 1943, he had the opportunity to read a personal report by Wagner regarding a discussion with Heinrich Himmler in which Himmler had expressed the intention to exterminate about 80% of the populations of France and England by [special forces of the SD after the German victory. 

He became a conspirator against Hitler. When Claus von Stauffenberg sought approval for an assassination attempt on 15 July 1944, Wagner was cited as being definite that the assassination of Hitler should be attempted only if Heinrich Himmler was also present. On 20 July, Wagner arranged the airplane that flew Stauffenberg from Rastenburg back to Berlin after the bomb that was believed to have killed Hitler had exploded.

After the failure of the coup attempt, Wagner feared that his arrest by the Gestapo was imminent and that he might be forced to implicate other plotters. He committed suicide by shooting himself in the head at noon on 23 July 1944.

References

External links
 Eduard Wagner biography at gdw-berlin.de

1894 births
1944 deaths
Holocaust perpetrators
German Army personnel of World War I
Reichswehr personnel
German Army generals of World War II
Generals of Artillery (Wehrmacht)
Members of the 20 July plot who committed suicide
People from Wunsiedel (district)
Suicides by firearm in Germany
People from the Kingdom of Bavaria